The Mütter Museum  is a medical museum located in the Center City area of Philadelphia, Pennsylvania. It contains a collection of anatomical and pathological specimens, wax models, and antique medical equipment. The museum is part of  The College of Physicians of Philadelphia. The original purpose of the collection, donated by Dr. Thomas Dent Mütter in 1858, was for biomedical research and education.

Collections 
The Mütter Museum originated as a collection of specimens and medical tools used for education in medicine. The museum has a collection of over 20,000 specimens, of which about 10% were on display as of 2018. This does not include the large literary collection contained within the Historical Medical Library, which is also housed within the College of Physicians of Philadelphia.

Osteological (skeletal) specimens 
The Mütter Museum is home to over 3,000 osteological specimens, including several full skeletons. One of the most famous of these is the fully articulated skeleton of Harry Raymond Eastlack, who suffered from FOP. Eastlack donated his skeleton to the Mütter collection to assist in further medical understanding of the condition.

Other osteological specimens include:
 The Mütter American Giant, the tallest human skeleton on exhibit in North America, at 7’6" (228.6 cm) tall.
 The Hyrtl Skull Collection, a collection of 139 skulls from Josef Hyrtl, an Austrian anatomist. This collection's original purpose was to show the diversity of cranial anatomy in Europeans.

Wet specimens 
The Mütter Collection comprises almost 1,500 wet specimens acquired between the 19th and 21st centuries. These include teratological specimens, cysts, tumors and other pathologies from nearly every organ of the body.

Wax models 
Augmenting the real human specimens on display are numerous wax models displaying various examples of pathology in the human body. These models, mostly produced by Tramond of Paris and Joseph Towne of London, were used for training in lieu of real human remains.

Other specimens 
The museum's holdings also include:
 A malignant tumor removed from President Grover Cleveland's hard palate
 The conjoined liver and plaster torso death cast of the famous Siamese twins Chang and Eng Bunker
 A piece of thoracic tissue removed from John Wilkes Booth, the assassin of President Abraham Lincoln
 A section of the brain of Charles J. Guiteau, the assassin of President James A. Garfield
 The Chevalier Jackson Foreign Body Collection

Einstein's brain 
The Mütter Museum is the only place where members of the public can view slides of Albert Einstein's brain on permanent display.

Exhibitions 
Many of the museum's collections comprise a permanent exhibition. The museum also hosts thematic exhibitions:

A Stitch in Spine Saves Nine
An exhibition demonstrating the development of spinal medicine and surgery

Broken Bodies, Suffering Spirits: Injury, Death, and Healing in Civil War Philadelphia
This large exhibit examines the history of medicine through the Civil War, and specifically how the conflict contributed to improvements in medical science in the Northeast US. It displays a collection of Civil War-era tools and instruments, contextualized via historical documents from the Medical History Library. Other artifacts include a USCT Muster Roll, which recorded soldier's military histories, health, and death.
The exhibition is accompanied by lesson plans and a nine-part documentary mini-series about the Civil War experience in Philadelphia.

Dr. Benjamin Rush Medicinal Plant Garden
Dr. Rush helped to found the College of Physicians of Philadelphia in 1787, which is now home to the Mütter Museum. Dr. Rush pushed for the maintenance of a medicinal garden to allow College Fellows to replenish items in their medicinal chests. The Garden was eventually founded in 1937. It displays between 50 and 60 medicinal herbs and plants, and is accompanied by an audio-tour for visitors to learn more about the original medicinal properties and uses of the botanical specimens, which include strawberries, wormwort, and bugleweed.

Special exhibitions
The museum is also host to a variety of changing special exhibits. Currently on display:
 Vesalius on the Verge: The Book and the Body, celebrating the 500th birthday of the famous anatomist
 Grimm's Anatomy, including rare illustrations from the Brothers Grimm
 A bi-annual art exhibition in the museum's art space, Thomson Gallery. These art exhibits invite established artists to complement the themes of the Mütter Collection, presenting medicine as both a science and an art. Philadelphia Neuroscience-Artist Greg Dunn's collection of neuron paintings and etchings have been shown.

Gretchen Worden 
Gretchen Worden remains perhaps the best known person associated with the Mütter Museum. She joined the museum staff as a curatorial assistant in 1975, became the museum's curator in 1982 and its director in 1988.

Worden was a frequent guest on the Late Show with David Letterman, "displaying a mischievous glee as she frightened him with human hairballs and wicked-looking Victorian surgical tools, only to disarm him with her antic laugh" and appeared in numerous PBS, BBC and cable television documentaries (including an episode of Errol Morris' show First Person) as well as NPR's "Fresh Air with Terry Gross" on the museum's behalf. She was also instrumental in the creation of numerous Mütter Museum projects, including the popular Mütter Museum calendars and the book, The Mütter Museum: Of the College of Physicians of Philadelphia. During Worden's tenure, the visitorship of the museum grew from several hundred visitors each year to, at the time of her death, more than 60,000 tourists annually.

After her death, the Mütter Museum opened a gallery in her memory. In an article written about the gallery's September 30, 2005 opening, the New York Times described the "Gretchen Worden Room":

Although Worden was known for using humor and shock factor to garner interest in the museum, she nonetheless was respectful of the museum's artifacts. In the foreword of The Mütter Museum: Of the College of Physicians of Philadelphia, she wrote "While these bodies may be ugly, there is a terrifying beauty in the spirits of those forced to endure these afflictions."

Podcast 
In September 2020, the Mütter Museum launched a medical history podcast, entitled My Favorite Malady.

Other related projects 
Blast Books has published two large books of photography involving the Mütter Museum.

The first book, 2002's The Mütter Museum: Of the College of Physicians of Philadelphia, contains images of the museum's exhibits shot by contemporary fine art photographers. Included in the book are photographs of "an early-19th-century Parisian widow with a six-inch (152 mm)  horn protruding from the forehead; the connected livers of Chang and Eng, the world-famous Siamese twins; the skeleton of a seven-foot, six-inch giant from Kentucky; and a collection of 139 skulls showing "anatomic variation among ethnic groups in central and eastern Europe", among others. William Wegman, Joel-Peter Witkin and Shelby Lee Adams have work that appear in the book.

The second book, 2007's Mütter Museum Historic Medical Photographs, focuses on the museum's archive of "rare historic photographs, most of which have never been seen by the public." Photographs ranging "from Civil War photographs showing injury and recovery, to the ravages of diseases not yet conquered in the 19th century, to pathological anomalies, to psychological disorders" are showcased.

Mütter, a screenplay based on the life of Mütter Museum founder Thomas Dent Mütter, won the 2003 "Set In Philadelphia" Screenwriting Award at the Philadelphia Film Festival and a Sloan Foundation Fellowship at the 2004 Hampton International Film Festival. The screenplay, written by poet and Philadelphia native Cristin O'Keefe Aptowicz, remains unproduced, although a short based on the feature-length script was created as a part of the Philadelphia Film Festival prize package.

In 2010, Aptowicz was named the 2010–2011 University of Pennsylvania ArtsEdge Writer-in-Residence and she noted that she will be using the residency to work on "a non-fiction book about the life and times of Thomas Dent Mütter." The museum has granted Aptowicz full access to their museum, library and archives for the duration of the residency so that she may conduct her research for the book, and the Mütter Museum's Francis C. Wood Institute for the History of Medicine has additionally awarded Aptowicz with a Wood Institute Travel Grant to help further fund and support her work on this project. In April 2013, it was announced that Aptowicz's biography of Mütter will be published in Fall 2014 by the Gotham Books division of Penguin. On September 4, 2014, Dr. Mütter's Marvels: A True Tale of Intrigue and Innovation at the Dawn of Modern Medicine was released to critical acclaim, including starred reviews in Publishers Weekly, Library Journal,  School Library Journal and Kirkus Reviews, as well as lengthy positive reviews in the Wall Street Journal, The Onion's AV Club and NPR. The book would debut at #7 on The New York Times Bestseller List for Books about Health.

In 2016, Harvard University Press published Bone Rooms: From Scientific Racism to Human Prehistory in Museums. The author, Samuel J. Redman, completed a pair of residencies through the Francis C. Wood Institute for the History of Medicine program in 2010 and 2015. A chapter in the book examines the history of collecting at the Mütter Museum.

References

External links 

 
 Mütter: short film based on the life of the Mütter Museum's founder, filmed at the Mütter Museum as part of the 2003 Philadelphia Film Festival
 James G. Mundie's drawings and photographs from The Mütter Museum
 A Discourse Commemorative of the Late Professor T.D. Mütter, M.D., LL.D. from 1859

Museums in Philadelphia
Natural history museums in Pennsylvania
Medical museums in Pennsylvania
Science museums in Pennsylvania
Center City, Philadelphia
Museums established in 1863